Parliamentary elections were held in Romania on 9 March 1980. The Front of Socialist Unity and Democracy, dominated by the Romanian Communist Party and including other mass organisations, was the only organisation that contested the election. No prospective candidate could run for office without the Front's approval. The Front won all 369 seats in the Great National Assembly.

Electoral system
Candidates were elected in single member constituencies, and had to receive over 50% of the vote. If no candidate passed this threshold, or if voter turnout in the constituency was less than 50%, re-runs were held until the requirements were met. Voters had the option of voting against the Front candidates.

Results

References

Parliamentary elections in Romania
Romania
Legislative
1980 in Romania
One-party elections
Romania